Knights of the Sound Table is the seventh album by the funk band Cameo, released in 1981. It reached number 2 for 3 weeks on the Top R&B/Hip-Hop Albums chart, number 44 on the Billboard 200 chart), and was the band’s fourth consecutive album to be certified Gold by the RIAA for sales of over 500,000 copies. The album spawned two hit singles: "Freaky Dancin'" (which reached number 3 R&B) and "I Like It" (which reached number 25 R&B. The track “Don’t Be So Cool” featured a guest appearance by former Labelle member Nona Hendryx and also received airplay on R&B stations at the time. Hendryx joined Cameo for a performance of the song on Soul Train that first aired on June 20, 1981.

Critical reception

Amy Hanson of AllMusic called it "the sound of a band keeping their past alive while stretching their wings to the future."

Track listing

Personnel
Larry Blackmon - lead vocals, drums, percussion
Gregory Johnson - Moog synthesizer, Fender Rhodes, vocals
Aaron Mills - bass guitar, vocals
Thomas 'T.C.' Campbell - keyboards
Anthony Lockett - guitar, vocals
Arnett Leftenant - saxophone, vocals
Nathan Leftenant - trumpet, vocals
David Weber - trumpet
Jeryl Bright - trombone, vocals
Clifford Adams - trombone
Jose Rossy - percussion
Tomi Jenkins, Steve Moore, Charlie Singleton - vocals
Nona Hendryx - backing vocals

Charts

Singles

References

External links

1981 albums
Cameo (band) albums